The 2015–16 UMBC Retrievers men's basketball team  represented the University of Maryland, Baltimore County during the 2015–16 NCAA Division I men's basketball season. The Retrievers, led by fourth-year head coach Aki Thomas, played their home games at the Retriever Activities Center and were members of the America East Conference. They finished the season 7–25, 3–13 in America East play to finish in last place. They lost in the first round of the America East tournament to Stony Brook.

On March 3, head coach Aki Thomas was fired. He finished at UMBC with a four-year record of 28–95.

Previous season
The Retrievers finished the season 4–26, 2–14 in America East play to finish in a tie for eighth place. They lost in the quarterfinals of the America East tournament to Vermont.

Departures

2015 incoming recruits

Roster

Schedule

|-
!colspan=9 style="background:#000000; color:#ffb210;"| Exhibition

|-
!colspan=9 style="background:#000000; color:#ffb210;"| Non-conference regular season

|-
!colspan=9 style="background:#000000; color:#ffb210;"| America East regular season

|-
!colspan=9 style="background:#000000; color:#ffb210;"| America East tournament

References

UMBC
UMBC Retrievers men's basketball seasons
UMBC Retrievers men's b
UMBC Retrievers men's b